La Vega, is the fourth largest city and municipality of the Dominican Republic. It is in La Vega Province. The city is known as the Carnaval epicenter of the Dominican Republic for its tradition and culture, its large agricultural production methods throughout its province.

History 

Christopher Columbus built a military fort near present-day La Vega, in 1494, intended to guard the route to the interior gold deposits of the Cibao valley. A Spanish settlement known as Concepción de la Vega gradually grew up around the fort.  After 1508, when gold was found in quantity there, Concepción became the first gold boomtown in the island. It already had a cathedral, two convents, a hospital, and several administration buildings. In La Vega the first coin was minted and the first merchants settled.

By 1510 it was one of the largest and most important European cities in the hemisphere. The city was destroyed and buried by an earthquake on December 2, 1562, and the survivors moved to the present site on the banks of the Camú River. The second foundation of the city corresponds to its current location and it is believed that it took place between the years 1562 and 1563. In the days of National Independence, the city of La Vega joined the cause of freedom with soldiers. On March 4, 1844, La Vega formalized its declaration in support of the War of Independence, and that same day it became the first town in the country to raise the national flag.

Commerce, agriculture and industry gained new momentum in the late 1800s and early 1900s. An event that strengthened the economic development of the area was the inauguration of the railway between the port of Sánchez and the city of La Vega. The transport by this means of fruits and merchandise led to new living conditions with settlers arriving from Santo Domingo, Santiago, Moca and other places. The first theater in the country was also built in La Vega. In 1915 the city received the name of a cultured city, due to its art and culture. In the place of the ruins of the first city, there is an archaeological park and a museum, the Pueblo Viejo National Park. Over the years, a town called Pueblo Viejo has emerged, in honor of the first place where the city existed.

Geography
La Vega is bounded on the north by the Camú River. This river flows about 100 kilometers before emptying into Yuna River. South of the city is the Cordillera Central, the largest mountain system of the Dominican Republic. El Ponton Field, a local airport, bounds the city on the east. To La Vega's west are the Camú River again and Montellano.

Climate
La Vega has a tropical rainforest climate (Köppen: Af)

Sectors

Government

Economy
The local industries are based upon cacao, coffee, tobacco, rice, and cattle production. There is also a small but very famous brewery called Cervecería Vegana known for its pilsener-style beers, named Quisqueya and Soberana. There is a factory known for making the famous sausage Induveca.

Religion
The shrine of Our Lady of Mercy called Santo Cerro is located in the place where Virgin Mary appeared to Christopher Columbus during a battle.

Education
There is an extension of the Universidad Nacional Pedro Henríquez Ureña and there is the Universidad Católica Tecnológica del Cibao. Since 2005 the national and local governments are planning to build an extension of the Universidad Autónoma de Santo Domingo, but there are some conflicts and the project is behind schedule. This city also has one of the most expensive schools in the country, the famous Colegio Agustiniano, which is the only in the country.

Private, public, and high schools

Laura vicuña

The Book Fair

Annually, the famous Feria del Libro de República Dominicana (Dominican Republic Book Fair) takes place in the city of La Vega. In this fair most of the famous books and literary works from Dominicans writers such as Juan Bosch, Joaquín Balaguer, w:es:Federico García Godoy, among others, and international writers such as Gabriela Mistral, Rubén Darío, Gabriel García Márquez, among others,
are sold, and some theatrical works are shown to the public. The fair is celebrated each year in the month of September, lasting about one week, and brings to this city all the editors from all around the country, selling many kinds of books, theatrical works, etc.

Transportation

There are many bus companies which travel between La Vega other cities like: Santo Domingo, Santiago, Samana, Puerto Plata, and others. There is also El Ponton Field, which serves domestics flights.

Sports

Each year between the months of October and December a basketball tournament is held in this city, it is called in Spanish Torneo Superior de Baloncesto de La Vega in English Superior Basketball Tournament of La Vega, This tournament started in October 1994 (after a time of political and cultural crisis between the years 1978 and October 1994). One team is still active, the other ("El Country Team") disappearing.

El Parque Hostos is the most winning team with ten crowns (1995, 2001, 2002, 2004, 2005, 2006, 2007, 2009, 2013, 2018) and six times as runner up (1997,2003,2008, 2014, 2015, 2021). 
La Matica is the second most winning team with six crowns (1994, 1999, 2000, 2010, 2011, 2021), six times as first runner up (1998, 2002, 2004, 2005, 2006, 2007) and qualified to the finals in 1996 but that year's finale was eventually canceled.
DOSA is the third most winning team with five crowns (1998, 2008, 2012, 2014, 2017) and five times as first runner up (2001, 2009, 2010, 2013,2019).
Enriquillo is the fourth most winning team with three crowns (2003, 2016, 2019), and two time as first runner up (2012,2017) and qualified to the finals in 1996 but that year's finale was eventually canceled.
La Villa is the fifth most winning team with two crowns (1997, 2015) and five times as runner up (1994, 1999, 2000, 2011, 2016, 2018).
In the tournament number 19 (2012) was the first time in the history of this tournament that none of the most winning teams Club La Matica & Club Parque Hostos didn't advance to the final.

Notable people
Juan Bosch: famous writer, former President of the Dominican Republic, from February 27, 1963, to September 24, 1963, and for decades a top, national political leader
Rhina Espaillat: bilingual Dominican-American poet
Zoilo H. Garcia: Aviator
Luis Alberti: Musician
Juan Carlos Payano: boxer
Victoriano Sosa: Boxer
Antonio Guzmán Fernández: former President of the Dominican Republic, 1978–1982
Larimar Fiallo: Miss Dominican Republic 2004
Cirilo J Guzmán: Lawyer
Francisco Moncion: ballet dancer, charter member of the New York City Ballet and choreographer 
Carlos de la Mota: Televisa actor
Vielka Valenzuela: Miss Dominican Republic 1994
Carola Durán: Miss Dominican Republic 2012
Ana Julia Quezada: murderer
Jonathan Villar: professional baseball player for the New York Mets of Major League Baseball.

References

Photo gallery

 
Populated places in La Vega Province
Municipalities of the Dominican Republic
Populated places established in the 1490s